Mughal-e-Azam is a 1960 Indian epic historical drama film. It may also refer to:

 Mughal-e-Azam (soundtrack), soundtrack to the film by Naushad
Mughal-e-Azam (musical), a Broadway-style musical based on the 1960 film
 Maan Gaye Mughal-e-Azam, a 2008 Indian film